Wake Up and Live is a 1937 Fox musical film directed by Sidney Lanfield and starring Walter Winchell, Ben Bernie and Alice Faye. Produced by Darryl F. Zanuck, the film was based upon the self-help bestseller by Dorothea Brande. It was followed by Love and Hisses (1937).

Cast
 Walter Winchell - as Himself
 Ben Bernie - as Himself
 Alice Faye - Alice Huntley
 Patsy Kelly - Patsy Kane
 Ned Sparks - Steve Cluskey
 Grace Bradley - Jean Roberts
 Jack Haley - Eddie Kane
 Walter Catlett - Gus Avery
 Joan Davis - Spanish Dancer
 Paul Hurst - McCabe
 Etienne Girardot - Waldo Peebles
 Condos Brothers
 Brewster Twins
 Elyse Knox - Nurse

Soundtrack
Music by Harry Revel, lyrics by Mack Gordon
"There's a Lull in My Life", which has become a jazz standard, was written for Alice Faye by Mack Gordon and Harry Revel. It was released as a single and became her only major hit record.  The film also features the songs:
"Never in a Million Years"
"Wake Up and Live"
"I'm Bubbling Over"
"Oh, But I'm Happy"
"Bernie's Love Song"
"I Love You Much Too Much, Muchacha"
"Red Seal Malt" 
"It's Swell of You"

References

External links 
 
 

1937 films
Films directed by Sidney Lanfield
American black-and-white films
1930s English-language films
1937 musical films
American musical films
Films produced by Darryl F. Zanuck
Films scored by Louis Silvers
20th Century Fox films
1930s American films